Slavery is a system which requires workers to work against their will for little to no compensation. In modern-day terms, this practice is more widely referred to as human trafficking. Human trafficking is defined by the United Nations Office on Drugs and Crime as “the recruitment, transportation, transfer, harboring or receipt of persons, by means of the threat or use of force or other forms of coercion, of abduction, of fraud, of deception, of the abuse of power or of a position of vulnerability or of the giving or receiving of payments or benefits to achieve the consent of a person having control over another person, for the purpose of exploitation”.  The practices of slavery and human trafficking are still prevalent in modern America with estimated 17,500 foreign nationals and 400,000 Americans being trafficked into and within the United States   every year with 80% of those being women and children.  Human trafficking in the United States can be divided into the two major categories of labor and sex trafficking, with sex trafficking accounting for a majority of cases.

History
In 1865, the Civil War was ended and the Emancipation Proclamation took full effect, freeing the slaves in the formerly Confederate-held territory. Later that same year, the 13th Amendment was passed, therefore officially outlawing the practice of slavery. A second section of this amendment allowing the government to enforce and pass laws to ensure the 13th amendment was upheld, but the ultimate end to the practice of slavery as defined by the amendment took many years to become realized, with many alternative forms of slavery still being practiced (i.e. sharecropping, peonage, convict leasing).

There is currently little knowledge as to the causes of trafficking. In the United States, human trafficking is a criminal activity thought to exist because of high demand, high profit and low risks.

Labor trafficking
Labor trafficking is defined by the Trafficking Victims Protection Act as the recruitment, harboring, transportation, provision, or obtaining of a person for labor or services, through the use of force, fraud  or coercion for the purpose of subjection to involuntary servitude, peonage, debt bondage or slavery and is most frequently reported in domestic work, restaurants, peddling rings, and sales crews.  With the influx of foreign nationals into the USA in the past decade, labor trafficking has become a central issue for human rights groups.

Agriculture
In the agriculture sector, the most common victims of trafficking are U.S. citizens and legal permanent residents, undocumented immigrants, and foreign nationals with temporary H-2A visas. Due to the nature of agricultural work as being seasonal and transient, the ability of employers to exploit these workers is high.  Such exploitation may take the form of threats of violence and playing on vulnerabilities (i.e. immigration status).  In some cases, workers are held in a state of perpetual debt to the crew leaders who impose mandatory transportation, housing and communication fees upon the workers which are high in relation to pay received, therefore further indebting the worker.  Crew leaders may also provide workers with H-2A visas and transportation to the place of work from a home country.

In 2010, the company Global Horizons was indicted on charges of trafficking more than 400 Thai workers through a program of bonded labor. Charges were ultimately dropped in 2012.

Domestic work
Domestic workers perform duties such as cleaning, cooking and childcare in their employers home.  Domestic workers are commonly US citizens, undocumented workers or foreign nationals most commonly holding one of the following visa types: A-3, G-5, NATO-7 or B-1  The most common victims of this type of trafficking are women. Similar means of control to Agricultural Work are common.  Additionally, a lack of legislation regarding the duties and protection of these workers facilitates their exploitation.  Employers commonly use the workers lack of knowledge of the language or legal system as a means of control and intimidation. This is also commonly paired with various forms of abuse and/or passport revocation.  Many domestic workers are brought to the United States on a promise of a better life or an education.

Trafficking hubs
California, Florida, New York, Nevada, Ohio and Texas are main hubs of human trafficking in the United States because of their “proximity to international borders, number of ports and airports, significant immigrant population, and large economy that includes industries that attract forced labor”.

Consequences

Health impacts
Trafficked workers often face permanent physical and psychological damage as a result of their ordeal such as posttraumatic stress disorder (PTSD) and other health problems.  Child workers face especially
serious consequences which may include a lack of education, illiteracy and stunted growth.

Economic impacts
Although the surface economic impact of labor trafficking can be seen as positive due to the cheap labor and a subsequent drop in the price of products, the negative economic impacts are significant.  The unseen costs of labor trafficking can include resources dedicated to its prevention, treatment of victims and apprehension of perpetrators.  This type of trafficking also diverts earnings from workers and their families to employers.  However, labor trafficking continues to be a primary source of income for criminal networks.

Sex slavery

History of sex slavery
The age-old issue of sex slavery became a political issue in the early 1900s, which led to a couple of important actions taken by national and international governments.

Mann Act
In the early 1900s, the “White Slave Traffic” became prevalent. It involved the movement of young white girls who were kidnapped or tricked into being involved in some form of prostitution. The Mann Act, passed in 1910, made it a felony to be involved in the transportation of any person across state or international lines for prostitution or other immoral purposes.

The Convention for the Suppression of the Traffic in Persons and of the Exploitation of the Prostitution of Others
This is a resolution of the UN General Assembly. The Preamble states: "Whereas prostitution and the accompanying evil of the traffic in persons for the purpose of prostitution are incompatible with the dignity and worth of the human person and endanger the welfare of the individual, the family and the community"

Contemporary sex slavery

Despite regulations, the occurrence of sex slavery/trafficking has not shown a decline over recent years. Millions of women are kidnapped and transported around the world. Some are sold by their families for small amounts of money.

There are some common patterns for sex trafficking. In developing nations, many women and children are brought into trafficking through false promises of a job, an education, and a better lifestyle. Because there are few options in these developing nations, many women decide to take advantage of this opportunity.

Once these individuals are sold, arrangements are made for their departure where they are assigned an escort who will take them directly to their new employer. At this point it becomes dangerous to attempt an escape. There are also other situations in which women can fall into sex trafficking. Women can receive false marriage proposals from men who plan to sell them into bondage. There are also instances when young girls are sold into the sex trade by their parents who are trying to earn some money. Many times women are kidnapped.

Sex trafficking frequently results in debt bondage. This involves the women and children being held by their employer until they earn enough money to repay the employer for the expenses he paid to acquire them. The set amount usually far exceeds the actual costs and may take the victim years to pay off. Even then, it is common for the woman or child to be forced to continue working or for their employer to sell them back into debt bondage and back into a system from which they cannot escape.

See also 
 Contemporary slavery
 Commercial sexual exploitation of children in the United States
 Human trafficking in the United States

References

 
United States
Slavery in the United States